is a 1949 black-and-white Japanese film directed by Torajiro Saito.

Cast 
 Hibari Misora
 Takako Irie (入江たか子)
 Harume Tone (利根はる恵)
 Nijiko Kiyokawa (清川虹子)
 Achako Hanabishi (花菱アチャコ)
 Shintarō Kido (木戸新太郎 / キドシン)
 Robba Furukawa (古川ロッパ)
 Kiiton Masuda (益田喜頓)
 Atsushi Watanabe (渡辺篤)
 Tamae Kiyokawa (清川玉枝)
 Yoshiko Sugiyama (杉山美子)
 and others

See also
 List of films in the public domain in the United States

References 

Japanese black-and-white films
1949 films
Films directed by Torajiro Saito
Toei Company films